George Henry Collin (June 4, 1856 – January 1, 1938) was an American politician in the state of Washington. He served in the Washington House of Representatives.

References

Members of the Washington House of Representatives
1856 births
1938 deaths
Washington (state) Populists